Paweł Buśkiewicz (born 18 March 1983 in Ryki) is a Polish professional football striker who last played for Olimpia Elbląg.

Career

Club
In February 2011, he joined Dolcan Ząbki. He was released from Dolcan Ząbki on 27 June 2011.

In July 2011, he joined Olimpia Elbląg on a one-year contract.

References

External links
 

1983 births
Living people
Polish footballers
Association football forwards
K.S.K. Beveren players
LASK players
Górnik Zabrze players
Polonia Warsaw players
Górnik Łęczna players
Olympiacos Volos F.C. players
Korona Kielce players
GKS Katowice players
Ząbkovia Ząbki players
Olimpia Elbląg players
People from Ryki
Sportspeople from Lublin Voivodeship